The squash competitions at the 2019 Southeast Asian Games in the Philippines were held from 1 to 9 December 2019 at the Manila Polo Club in Makati, Metro Manila.

Background
Nine events were proposed for squash at the 2019 Southeast Asian Games with six events approved to be hosted. However, due to delays in the construction of the squash courts at the Rizal Memorial Sports Complex, the original venue, the number of events were trimmed to five. The men's double jumbo, women's double jumbo, and mixed doubles were scrapped and replaced with team events for both men and women.

Venue
Squash events were held at the Manila Polo Club in Makati. It was initially scheduled to take place at the squash courts at the Rizal Memorial Sports Complex in Manila. The Kerry Sports gymnasium inside the Shangri-La at the Fort in Taguig was also considered as a backup venue for squash.

Participating nations

  (7)
  (9)
  (8)
  (8)
  (8)

Medal summaries

Medalists

Medal table

References

External links
  

 
Squash at the Southeast Asian Games
2019 Southeast Asian Games events
2019 in squash